Way to Blue: An Introduction to Nick Drake is a 1994 compilation album featuring tracks by English singer/songwriter Nick Drake, taken from his original three albums plus Time of No Reply. The album reached gold certificate in the U.K. on 30 September 1999 after selling 100,000 copies. In United States in the year 2000 sales have jumped to 67,916 units.

In Europe, this spawned a series of Introduction to... compilations of various artists in the Universal Music roster.

Track listing
All songs by Nick Drake.

 "Cello Song" – 4:45
 from Five Leaves Left, 1969
 "Hazey Jane I" – 4:28
 from Bryter Layter, 1971
 "Way to Blue" – 3:09
 from Five Leaves Left, 1969
 "Things Behind the Sun" – 3:56
 from Pink Moon, 1972
 "River Man" – 4:20
 from Five Leaves Left, 1969
 "Poor Boy" – 6:06
 from Bryter Layter, 1971
 "Time of No Reply" – 2:44
 from Time of No Reply, 1987
 "From the Morning" – 2:30
 from Pink Moon, 1972
 "One of These Things First" – 4:50
 from Bryter Layter, 1971
 "Northern Sky" – 3:44
 from Bryter Layter, 1971
 "Which Will" – 2:56
 from Pink Moon, 1972
 "Hazey Jane II" – 3:44
 from Bryter Layter, 1971
 "Time Has Told Me" – 4:25
 from Five Leaves Left, 1969
 "Pink Moon" – 2:03
 from Pink Moon, 1972
 "Black Eyed Dog" – 3:25
 from Time of No Reply, 1987
 "Fruit Tree" – 4:45
 from Five Leaves Left, 1969

Personnel 
Nick Drake performs vocals and acoustic guitar on all songs and piano on "Pink Moon".

Also features (on various songs):

  Robert Kirby – String Arrangements
  Richard Thompson – Guitar
  John Cale – Organ, Celeste
  Chris McGregor – Piano
  Paul Harris – Piano
  Danny Thompson – Double Bass
  Dave Pegg – Bass
  Ed Carter – Bass
  Mike Kowalski – Drums
  Rocky Dzidzornu – Conga, Shaker
  Doris Troy – Backing Vocals
  P.P. Arnold – Backing Vocals
  Patrick Arnold – Backing Vocals
  Ray Warleigh – Saxophone

References

Nick Drake compilation albums
Albums produced by Joe Boyd
Albums produced by John Wood (record producer)
1994 compilation albums